The World of Outlaws (often abbreviated WoO) is an American motorsports sanctioning body. The body sanctions two major national touring series. It is best known for sanctioning the World of Outlaws Sprint Car Series and the World of Outlaws Late Model Series. These dirt track racing series are owned and operated by World Racing Group. The Sprint Car Series is sponsored by Monster Beverage's NOS Energy Drink and beginning in 2022 the Late Model Series will be sponsored by Case Construction Equipment.

World of Outlaws Sprint Car Series

The body sanctions a national tour of high power to weight, custom fabricated sprint cars called the World of Outlaws NOS Energy Drink Sprint Car Series. The race cars feature large adjustable wings on the top and large rear tires that transfer their power to the dirt tracks they race on. The series travels primarily the United States, but has sanctioned races in Canada, Mexico and Australia.  The title sponsor is NOS Energy Drink.

The series was founded in 1978 by Ted Johnson, a former midget racer from Madison, Wisconsin.  At the time sprint car racing in the United States lacked a true national series.  Johnson organized the World of Outlaws sanctioning body and established a national schedule, a set of rules and a points system to crown a champion of his series.

In 2003, Johnson sold the series to Boundless Motor Sports Racing, later renamed Dirt Motorsports and currently World Racing Group. In 2004, the subscription-based streaming service DIRTVision was founded. It originally offered radio broadcasts of all races, and added video streaming to select races, until reaching the full calendar in 2018. Select races are broadcast on delay nationally on the CBS Sports Network with MavTV showing the Knoxville Nationals since 2013. Previous broadcasters include The Nashville Network and Speed Channel shown live or on delay.

Sprint car specifications
A WoO Sprint Car must weigh at least 1,425 pounds (646kg) with the driver in the car.  The mandated 410-cubic inch engine (6.7 litre) produces over 900 horsepower, uses mechanical fuel injection and must run on methanol fuel.  The series' specification tire manufacturer Continental AG works with the World of Outlaws to designate legal tire compounds for a circuit among different compounds available to competitors, as the tire must suitably respond to the track surface.  Continental technicians will reject certain compounds at certain circuits if they are unfit for the surface or may provide an unfair advantage. The series' cars have a large top mounted wing with sideboards that face opposite directions to help produce a great amount of downforce to help the car turn and maximize grip, both in the corners and on the straightaways. The cars also have smaller wings on the nose to provide more downforce to the front wheels.

Sprint cars use "quick change" rear ends. This allows the teams to quickly change the gear ratio for different size tracks. Most cars use a torsion bar suspension system. Different size bars either soften or stiffen the suspension. Torsion bars, and specialty shock absorbers are the key ingredients in the handling of sprint cars. That coupled with the wings, tire stagger, light weight, and enormous horsepower make these cars some of the fastest race cars in the world. The monstrous power-to-weight ratios of Sprint Cars can exceed that of Formula 1 cars in the right circumstances.

Sprint Cars have a very distinct stance since they have two very different sized rear tires. The right rear tire on a sprint car is 105 inches in circumference. In contrast, the left rear tire is only between 90 and 98 inches in circumference, depending on the track size and conditions. The difference in the tire sizes is called stagger. The more stagger the car has, the sharper the car can turn, but at the expense of straight line speed.

Sprint cars do not have starters, so push trucks are used to push the cars to start the engines. Sprint Cars only have an in/out direct drive with a fixed gear ratio, no reverse gear and no clutch.

Typical race night program 

 Motor Heat & Wheel pack
 Hot laps (practice laps)
 Time trials (time trials or qualifying, usually two laps with the fastest lap being the qualifying time)
 Heat races (set based on qualifying time)
 Toyota Dash (sets the top three or four rows of the fastest cars for the A-main)
 Last Chance Showdown (B-Main, C-Main or D-Main depending on car count)
 Feature (A-Main, which can be anywhere from 25 to 55 laps)

Past Champions 
Source:

Top 25 all-time A-Feature winners
Note: Includes all full-field preliminary race wins. 
Those with a yellow background indicates Knoxville National winners. 
Updated August 31, 2022.

World of Outlaws Kevin Gobrecht Rookie of the Year 
Source:

Popular Events 
Here is a list of top paying and more popular race events each year. Most are two days or more.

Final night features are usually based on points earned on the previous night's races. 

An asterisk marks single-day events where the entire program is run on one day.

Notable drivers who have raced with the World of Outlaws Sprint Cars Series

Late Model Series

Operating since 2004, the Late Model Series is a racing championship series for late models.

References

External links

 World of Outlaws official website

 
Auto racing series in the United States
Auto racing series in Canada
Dirt track racing in the United States
Open wheel racing